Cwmdu railway station served the hamlet of Cwmdu, in the historical county of Glamorganshire, Wales, from 1913 to 1932 on the Port Talbot Railway.

History 
The station was opened on 9 June 1913 by the Great Western Railway. It replaced the old Garth station to the south. It closed to passengers on 12 September 1932 and closed to goods in 1964.

References 

Disused railway stations in Bridgend County Borough
Former Great Western Railway stations
Railway stations in Great Britain opened in 1913
Railway stations in Great Britain closed in 1932
1913 establishments in Wales
1932 disestablishments in Wales